Sangla is a town in the Baspa Valley, also referred to as the Sangla valley, in the Kinnaur District of Himachal Pradesh, India, close to the Tibetan border.

Geography
Sangla Valley or the Baspa  Valley starts at Karcham and ends at Chitkul.

Demographics
The local people have a distinct culture and their own dialect, the Kinnauri language.

Places of Interest
Being located at center of the Baspa valley, Sangla is the locus of exploration and trekking trails. 

Kamru Fort

Lake and Dam, Kupa

Temples

 Badrinath Temple, Kamru
 Bering Nag Temple, Sangla
 Batseri
 Mata Devi Temple Chhitkul
 Piri Nages Temple, Sapni 

Trek Routes

 Rupin Valley Trek
 Sangla Kande Trek
 Charang Chitkul Trek

Apart from these places, the tourists can walk to the Trout Farm, The Mall(Sangla), Riverside in Chitkul and village walks in Kupa, Kamru, Sangla and Batseri.

Festivals
 Saazo - January
 Faagul/ Holi - March
 Dakhrain - July
 Ukhyang  - September

Gallery

References

External links

Sangla Valley Travelblog
Baspa Valley blog

Tourism in Himachal Pradesh
Cities and towns in Kinnaur district